"All I Ever Wanted" is a song by British singer-songwriter Kirsty MacColl, which was released in 1991 as the third and final single from her third studio album Electric Landlady. It was written by MacColl and Marshall Crenshaw, and produced by Steve Lillywhite.

Background
In a promotional video on the making of Electric Landlady, MacColl commented, "'All I Ever Wanted' is a song I wrote with Marshall Crenshaw some time ago. We actually wrote it by post. He sent me a cassette from New York of some chord patterns that he'd put down. Then I put down some vocals and got the lyrics together, and sent it back to him. And he was like 'Well I can't sing this, this is a girl's song', so we put it on hold and now I've finally done it. I recorded it in New York with the Latin band. It sounds great, it sounds like Buddy Holly and Acapulco."

Crenshaw later submitted the song when asked to provide a song for the film That Thing You Do! but it was not selected.

Release
The song was remixed for its release as a single. Three live tracks were included across the single's different formats: "There's a Guy Works Down the Chip Shop Swears He's Elvis", "Walk Right Back" and "A New England". The tracks were recorded live for BBC Radio 1's Into the Night on 26 June 1991.

"All I Ever Wanted" reached No. 154 on the Australian ARIA Singles Chart in January 1992. The song failed to make an appearance in the top 75 of the UK Singles Chart, but reached No. 35 on the Music Week Playlist Chart in October 1991.

Music video
A music video was filmed to promote the single. It was directed by Jeff Baynes, produced by Michael Brown and features Rowland Rivron.

Critical reception
On its release as a single, Andrew Hirst of the Huddersfield Daily Examiner described "All I Ever Wanted" as a "flighty folk number", but added that it was a "strange single choice when far better tunes lay dormant on her excellent Electric Landlady album". Andrew Collins of NME felt it "sounds like an album track" as well as "a kid's TV theme made out of 'American Pie'". He added, "However, I hope it goes to number one for 14 weeks so that Virgin feel shit about refusing to fund Kirsty's first tour. How much did the Paris Angels' limo cost?"

In a review of Electric Landlady, Steve Pick of the St. Louis Post-Dispatch commented how "All I Ever Wanted" "implicitly connects the early Beatles with the bossa nova that had to influence them". Mike Curtin of The Post-Star described the song as "the best 10,000 Maniacs song that the Jamestown, N.Y., folk-rock band never wrote". Casey Seiler of the Jackson Hole Guide noted the song's "rock-guitar twang".

John Kovalic of the Wisconsin State Journal wrote, "The solid, catchy pop of 'All I Ever Wanted' may be the [album]'s strongest selling point". Barbara Jaeger of The Record noted, "The collection has its share of folk-rock tunes, the catchiest of which are 'All I Ever Wanted' and 'He Never Mentioned Love'. The delightful melodies of both are the springboards from which MacColl's voice soars." In The Trouser Press Guide to '90s Rock, Ira A. Robbins said of MacColl's 1995 compilation Galore, "Galore gives Electric Landlady short shrift by omitting the pure pop delight of 'All I Ever Wanted'."

Track listing
7" and cassette single
"All I Ever Wanted" - 3:30
"There's a Guy Works Down the Chip Shop Swears He's Elvis" (Live) - 3:49

CD single (UK #1)
"All I Ever Wanted" - 3:30
"There's a Guy Works Down the Chip Shop Swears He's Elvis" (Live) - 3:49
"Walk Right Back" (Live) - 3:38
"A New England" (Live Acoustic Duet with Billy Bragg) - 3:27

CD single (UK #2)
"All I Ever Wanted" - 3:30
"What Do Pretty Girls Do?" - 2:38
"Walk Right Back" (Live) - 3:38
"There's a Guy Works Down the Chip Shop Swears He's Elvis" (Live) - 3:49

CD single (US promo)
"All I Ever Wanted" - 3:30
"All the Tears That I Cried" - 3:31

Personnel
All I Ever Wanted
 Kirsty MacColl – vocals
 Pete Glenister – guitar
 Elliott Randall – guitar
 Ian Aitken – acoustic guitar
 Oscar Hernández – piano
 Judd Lander – harmonica
 Sal Cuevas – bass
 Robbie Ameen – drums
 Milton Cardona – conga
 José Mangual Jr. – bongo guiro
 Marc Quiñones – timbal

Production
 Steve Lillywhite – producer ("All I Ever Wanted", "What Do Pretty Girls Do?"), mixing on single version of "All I Ever Wanted"
 Jon Fausty – engineer and mixing on album version of "All I Ever Wanted"
 John Brough – engineer on album version of "All I Ever Wanted"
 Alan Douglas – engineer on album version of "All I Ever Wanted"
 Pete Lewis – mixing on album version of "All I Ever Wanted"
 Howard Gray – mixing on single version of "All I Ever Wanted"
 Trevor Gray – mixing on single version of "All I Ever Wanted"
 Paul Williams – producer (BBC live tracks)
 Paul Roberts – engineer (BBC live tracks)

Other
 Kirsty MacColl – sleeve design
 Bill Smith Studio – sleeve design
 Charles Dickins – photography

Charts

References

1991 songs
1991 singles
Kirsty MacColl songs
Songs written by Kirsty MacColl
Songs written by Marshall Crenshaw
Song recordings produced by Steve Lillywhite
Virgin Records singles